The 1905–06 Kansas Jayhawks men's basketball team represented the University of Kansas in its eighth season of collegiate basketball. The head coach was James Naismith, the inventor of the game, who served his 8th year in that capacity. The Jayhawks finished the season 12–7, their first winning record since the 1898–99 season. Phog Allen, who would later become the Jayhawks head coach, played on the team.

Roster
Frank Barlow
Ralph Bergen
Forrest Allen
Charles Johnson
Milton Miller
William Miller
Charles Siler
Cecil Smith
Roscoe Winnagle

Schedule

References

Kansas Jayhawks men's basketball seasons
Kansas
Kansas Jayhawks men's b
Kansas Jayhawks men's b